Salum Swedi (born 3 December 1980) is a retired Tanzanian footballer.

He played international football for Tanzania. On 19 February 2010 he has announced his retirement from international football.

References

1980 births
Living people
People from Dar es Salaam
Tanzanian footballers
Young Africans S.C. players
Mtibwa Sugar F.C. players
Azam F.C. players
Mwadui United F.C. players
Association football central defenders
Tanzania international footballers
Tanzanian Premier League players
2009 African Nations Championship players
Tanzania A' international footballers